Donald Wayne Young (born October 18, 1945) is a former professional baseball player. He played two seasons in Major League Baseball in 1965 and 1969, primarily as a center fielder.

Young was signed by the St. Louis Cardinals as an amateur free agent in 1963. In his first major league at bat, he popped up to become the first out in Sandy Koufax's 1965 perfect game. He played only 11 games in 1965, and then spent three years in the minors before coming up to the Cubs again, playing 101 games in the tumultuous 1969 season.

In the ninth inning of a game against the New York Mets on July 8, 1969 playing centerfield Young failed to catch balls hit by Ken Boswell and Donn Clendenon. Both were ruled doubles. Young had the Clendenon ball in his mitt before crashing into the wall; with Boswell stopping at third thinking the ball was caught. A Cleon Jones double followed that tied the game. After an intentional walk to Art Shamsky a single by Ed Kranepool plated Jones with the winning run.  The line score in the 9th was 3 runs on 4 hits with two left on with no errors. Ferguson Jenkins went the distance in the loss. After the game manager Leo Durocher blamed Young for the loss. Among other things, Durocher said, ``My 3-year-old could have caught those balls.``Teammate Ron Santo loudly criticized Young in the clubhouse accusing him of letting his concern about hitting influence his fielding. The next day Santo apologized to Young and called a press conference to make a public apology. The Cubs, who had a nine-game lead as late as Aug. 16, went on to lose the pennant by eight games to the Mets. Don Young was blamed by many for the Cubs collapse. The Bill James Historical Baseball Abstract and the book Baseball Hall of Shame 2 both state a greater factor was manager Leo Durocher not resting his regular players who played all their home games in Wrigley Field, before it installed lights, under the Chicago sun.

Young played two more partial seasons in the minor leagues before leaving organized baseball.

References

Sources

Major League Baseball center fielders
Chicago Cubs players
Billings Mustangs players
Brunswick Cardinals players
St. Cloud Rox players
Wenatchee Chiefs players
Dallas–Fort Worth Spurs players
Tulsa Oilers (baseball) players
Lodi Crushers players
Tacoma Cubs players
Iowa Oaks players
Baseball players from Houston
1945 births
Living people